The La Salle Explorers baseball team was a varsity intercollegiate athletic team of La Salle University in Philadelphia, Pennsylvania, United States. The team was a member of the Atlantic 10 Conference, which is part of the National Collegiate Athletic Association's Division I. The team played its home games at Hank DeVincent Field in Philadelphia, Pennsylvania.

La Salle announced in September 2020 that baseball would be one of the seven sports to be dropped at the end of the 2020–21 academic year for sustainability reasons.

See also
List of NCAA Division I baseball programs

References

External links
 

 
2021 disestablishments in Pennsylvania